Teie is a part of the urban area of Tønsberg, located on the island of Nøtterøy, as well as in Nøtterøy municipality, Norway.

It is located at the northern end of the island, near Vestskogen. The newspaper Øyene has been published in Teie since 1999.

References

Villages in Vestfold og Telemark
Nøtterøy